Antoine Gérard  (born 15 June 1995) is a French Nordic combined skier who competes internationally.

He competed at the 2018 Winter Olympics.

References

External links 
 
 

1995 births
Living people
French male Nordic combined skiers
Olympic Nordic combined skiers of France
Nordic combined skiers at the 2018 Winter Olympics
Nordic combined skiers at the 2022 Winter Olympics
People from Remiremont
Université Savoie-Mont Blanc alumni
Sportspeople from Vosges (department)